Oxaya Formation is a geological formation in northern Chile made up of ignimbrite sheets. The formation formed about 25 to 19 million years ago in the Late Oligocene and Early Miocene. Oxaya Formation is deformed by the Oxaya anticline.

References

Geologic formations of Chile
Miocene Series of South America
Oligocene Series of South America
Neogene Chile
Miocene volcanism
Oligocene volcanism
Geology of Arica y Parinacota Region